Phimodera is a genus of shield-backed bugs in the family Scutelleridae. There are about 11 described species in Phimodera.

Species
These 11 species belong to the genus Phimodera:
 Phimodera amblygonia Fieber, 1863
 Phimodera binotata (Say, 1824)
 Phimodera flori Fieber, 1863
 Phimodera fumosa Fieber, 1863
 Phimodera galgulina (Herrich-Schaeffer, 1837)
 Phimodera humeralis (Dalman, 1823)
 Phimodera lapponica (Zetterstedt, 1828)
 Phimodera oculata Jakovlev, 1880
 Phimodera torpida Walker, 1867
 Phimodera torrida Reuter, 1906
 Phimodera tuberculata Jakovlev, 1874

References

Further reading

External links

 

Scutelleridae
Articles created by Qbugbot